Onnam Prathi Olivil is a 1985 Indian Malayalam-language film, directed by Baby and produced by A. P. Lal. The film stars Rahman and Kamini in the lead roles. The film has musical score by K. J. Joy.

Cast
Rahman
Kamini
T. G. Ravi
Shanavas

Soundtrack
The music was composed by K. J. Joy with lyrics by P. Bhaskaran.

References

External links
 

1985 films
1980s Malayalam-language films
Films directed by Baby (director)